Katherine Hannigan (born 1962) is a children's and young adults' writer.

Biography
Hannigan was born in Lockport, New York in 1962. She has undergraduate degrees in mathematics, education, and painting, and a Master of Fine Arts in studio art. She has worked as assistant professor of art and design and as an education coordinator for Head Start. She currently lives in a small town in Iowa.

Works
Ida B. (2004)
Emmaline and the Bunny - (2009) 
True... (sort of) - (2011)
Dirt + Warter = Mud - (2016)

Awards
2004 Josette Frank Award, Ida B
2004 Mitten Award, Ida B

References

External links
KatherineHannigan.com

Living people
1962 births
21st-century American novelists
American children's writers
American women novelists
American women children's writers
21st-century American women writers
People from Lockport, New York